James Ogilvie (died 1518) was a late medieval Scottish prelate who served as Bishop of Aberdeen. After the death of William Elphinstone (died  24 October 1514), the bishopric of Aberdeen became vacant. Ogilvie was nominated for the vacancy by John Stewart, Duke of Albany. At Rome however, Pope Leo X provided Robert Forman to the vacant see, while the canons of Aberdeen elect Alexander Gordon, allegedly under pressure from the latter's cousin Alexander Gordon, 3rd Earl of Huntly. It was because of this that Ogilvie resigned his rights to this bishopric, and in compensation, became Commendator-Abbot of Dryburgh. During the early days of his commendatorship, it was recorded that he was a canon of the diocese of Aberdeen and the parson of Kinkell, Aberdeenshire. Ogilvie held the commendatorship for merely three years, dying on 30 May 1518.

References
Dowden, John, The Bishops of Scotland, ed. J. Maitland Thomson, (Glasgow, 1912)
Innes, Cosmo, Registrum Episcopatus Aberdonensis: Ecclesie Cathedralis Aberdonensis Regesta Que Extant in Unum Collecta, Vol. 1, (Edinburgh, 1845)
Keith, Robert, An Historical Catalogue of the Scottish Bishops: Down to the Year 1688, (London, 1924)
Watt, D.E.R., Fasti Ecclesiae Scotinanae Medii Aevi ad annum 1638, 2nd Draft, (St Andrews, 1969)
Watt, D. E. R., & Shead, N. F. (eds.), The Heads of Religious Houses in Scotland from the 12th to the 16th Centuries, The Scottish Records Society, New Series, Volume 24, (Edinburgh, 2001)

15th-century births
1518 deaths
Bishops of Aberdeen
Scottish abbots